Leon Bell Bell (born 6 September 1996) is a German professional footballer who plays as a left-back or left midfielder for 1. FC Magdeburg.

References

Living people
1996 births
Sportspeople from Hanau
German people of Cameroonian descent
German footballers
Footballers from Hesse
Association football fullbacks
Association football midfielders
1. FC Kaiserslautern II players
FSV Frankfurt players
1. FC Magdeburg players
3. Liga players
Regionalliga players